William Stumpe (by 1498 – 22 July 1552) of Malmesbury, Wiltshire, was a clothier and an English politician.

Career
Stumpe was a leading Wiltshire clothier. At the dissolution of Malmesbury Abbey, he was able to acquire the monastery site. He gave the nave of the abbey church to be the town's parish church. He filled the other monastic buildings with weaving looms, and built his own house in the precinct.

He was also a Member (MP) of the Parliament of England for Malmesbury in 1529 and 1547. He was appointed High Sheriff of Wiltshire for 1551 until his death in 1552.

Family
Stumpe married, by 1519, Joyce Berkeley, daughter of James Berkeley of Bradley, Gloucestershire. They had two sons Sir James and John Stumpe. His second wife was Tibbalda, the widow of William Billing of Deddington, Oxfordshire, who had died 28 August 1533. In 1551, he married for a third time, to Catherine, the widow of Richard Mody of Garsdon, Wiltshire, who had died 8 November 1550.

His eldest son James (d. 1563) was also appointed High Sheriff and was a Member of Parliament.

References

15th-century births
1552 deaths
High Sheriffs of Wiltshire
English MPs 1529–1536
English MPs 1547–1552